Ilie Oantă (born 17 November 1950) is a Romanian rower. He competed in the men's coxless pair event at the 1972 Summer Olympics.

References

External links
 

1950 births
Living people
Romanian male rowers
Olympic rowers of Romania
Rowers at the 1972 Summer Olympics
Sportspeople from Bucharest
World Rowing Championships medalists for Romania